Ammonium fluoride is the inorganic compound with the formula NH4F. It crystallizes as small colourless prisms, having a sharp saline taste, and is highly soluble in water. Like all fluoride salts, it is moderately toxic in both acute and chronic overdose.

Crystal structure
Ammonium fluoride adopts the wurtzite crystal structure, in which both the ammonium cations and the fluoride anions are stacked in ABABAB... layers, each being tetrahedrally surrounded by four of the other. There are N−H···F hydrogen bonds between the anions and cations. This structure is very similar to ice, and ammonium fluoride is the only substance which can form mixed crystals with water.

Reactions
On passing hydrogen fluoride gas (in excess) through the salt, ammonium fluoride absorbs the gas to form the addition compound ammonium bifluoride. The reaction occurring is:
NH4F + HF → NH4HF2

It sublimes when heated—a property common among ammonium salts. In the sublimation, the salt decomposes to ammonia and hydrogen fluoride, and the two gases can recombine to give ammonium fluoride, i.e. the reaction is reversible:
[NH4]F ⇌ NH3 + HF

Uses
This substance is commonly called "commercial ammonium fluoride". The word "neutral" is sometimes added to "ammonium fluoride" to represent the neutral salt—[NH4]F vs. the "acid salt" (NH4HF2). The acid salt is usually used in preference to the neutral salt in the etching of glass and related silicates. This property is shared among all soluble fluorides. For this reason it cannot be handled in glass test tubes or apparatus during laboratory work.

It is also used for preserving wood, as a mothproofing agent, in printing and dyeing textiles, and as an antiseptic in breweries.

References

Fluorides
Nonmetal halides
Ammonium compounds